An Anthology is a compilation of recordings featuring guitarist Duane Allman. The double album consists of a selection of songs by various artists that Allman contributed to as a session musician, along with early recordings by his band the Hourglass and his partial-namesake group, the Allman Brothers Band.  The album also features rare solo work by the guitarist.

Music critic Stephen Thomas Erlewine awarded the compilation four and a half stars out of five in his review for the AllMusic website, calling it "an excellent introduction and retrospective."  He also noted that "by including session cuts, as well as his brief sojourn in Eric Clapton's Derek and the Dominos and a few rare solo tracks, along with a number of representative Allman Brothers songs, the double-album Anthology winds up drawing a complete portrait of Allman."

Track listing

References

1972 compilation albums
Duane Allman albums